Alfred Henry Bence (October 18, 1908 – May 27, 1977) was a Canadian politician and barrister. He was elected to the House of Commons of Canada in 1940 as a Member of the Progressive Conservative Party to represent the riding of Saskatoon City. He was defeated in 1945 and 1949. He was an alderman for Saskatoon between 1939 and 1940.

External links
 

1908 births
1977 deaths
Members of the House of Commons of Canada from Saskatchewan
Progressive Conservative Party of Canada MPs
Place of death missing